Zagheh (also Romanized as Zāgheh; also known as Zāgheh-ye ‘Olyā, Z̄āgheh Chūbdar, and Zāgheh-ye Bālā) is a village in Zhan Rural District, in the Central District of Dorud County, Lorestan Province, Iran. At the 2006 census, its population was 72, in 14 families.

References 

Towns and villages in Dorud County